Manasie Akpaliapik (born 1955) is a Canadian Inuit sculptor.  

Akpaliapik was born in Baffin Island and lived with his family in Arctic Bay from 1967. He was sent to school in Iqaluit but never graduated. Instead, he got married and returned to Arctic Bay. His wife and two children were killed in a fire in 1980, after which Akpaliapik moved to Montreal and subsequently to Toronto.

Work
Akpaliapik sculpts with bone, ivory, and stone. His sculptures typically have human or animal forms and are closely connected with traditional beliefs. He learned carving from his family and started to carve professionally after 1980. In 1989, he received a government grant to study certain aspects of Inuit culture. He also delivers workshops about Inuit art.

Exhibitions and collections
In 2017, the Art Gallery of Ontario held a solo exhibition of his work.

Akpaliapik's works are in included in the collection of the National Gallery of Canada in Ottawa, Musée national des beaux-arts du Québec and the Art Gallery of Ontario in Toronto.

In 2021 the Musée national des beaux-arts du Québec held Manasie Akpaliapik Inuit Universe with works from the collection of Raymond Brousseau, the first time it devoted an exhibition to a single Inuk artist.

References

External links 
 

Inuit sculptors
Living people
1955 births
People from Arctic Bay
Animal artists